Nikolai Kotlyar (5 May 1935 – 9 October 2003) was a Soviet engineer, maritime specialist and politician who was the last minister of the fishing industry.

Early life and education
Nikolai Kotlyar was born on 5 May 1935.  He was a graduate of the Far Eastern Technical Institute of Fishing Industry and Economy where he obtained a degree in mechanical engineering. He also attended the Academy of National Economy in 1980.

Career and activities
Kotlyar was a member of the Communist Party. Following his graduation he worked as an engineer at a fishery in the maritime territory. He also served in several Party organs and then at various units of the Dalryba association which was responsible for the fishery activities near to Japan. In 1977 he was appointed head of the department for active sea fishing at Primorrybprom. 

Kotlyar was named as the minister of the fishing industry on 8 January 1987. He replaced Vladimir Kamentsev in the post. Kotlyar's term was extended in July 1989. He was removed from the office by Boris Yeltsin in August 1991 when he and his deputies supported the dissidents and ordered the fishermen to follow them. Upon this incident the ministry was also disestablished and the ministry staff was attached to the ministry of agriculture.

He died in Moscow on 9 October 2003.

Awards
Kotlyar was the recipient of the following:

 Order of Lenin
 Order of the October Revolution
 Order of the Red Banner of Labour

References

20th-century Russian engineers
21st-century Russian engineers
1935 births
2003 deaths
Communist Party of the Soviet Union members
People's commissars and ministers of the Soviet Union
Recipients of the Order of Lenin
Recipients of the Order of the Red Banner of Labour
Russian mechanical engineers
Soviet mechanical engineers